The little clingfish (Parvicrepis parvipinnis) is a species of clingfish found in reef environments along the coast of Australia.  This species grows to a length of  TL.  This species is the only known member of its genus. This species was described by Edgar Ravenswood Waite as Diplocrepis parvipinnis in 1906 with a type locality of Long Bay, Sydney, New South Wales. In 1931 Gilbert Percy Whitley raised the monotypic genus Parvicrepis for this species.

References

Gobiesocidae
Monotypic fish genera
Fish of Australia
Fish described in 1906